Doris Duranti (25 April 1917 – 10 March 1995) was an Italian film actress. She appeared in 43 films between 1935 and 1975. She had a years-long affair with Alessandro Pavolini, a Fascist politician who in 1945 was executed by Italian partisans; his body was then hung with that of Benito Mussolini.

Partial filmography

 Il serpente a sonagli (1935) - Collegiale
 Golden Arrow (1935)
 Aldebaran (1935) - Anna's friend
 The Phantom Gondola (1936) - Nelly
 Lo squadrone bianco (1936) - Una turista (uncredited)
 Vivere! (1936)
 Ginevra degli Almieri (1936)
 White Amazons (1936)
 Sentinels of Bronze (1937) - Dahabò
 Under the Southern Cross (1938) - Mailù
 Diamonds (1939) - Marta Aurasco
 Cavalleria rusticana (1939) - Lola
 Wealth Without a Future (1940) - Laura, loro nipote
 È sbarcato un marinaio (1940) - Nelly
 The Cavalier from Kruja (1940) - Eliana Haidar
 The Daughter of the Green Pirate (1940) - Manuela, la figlia del Corsaro Verde
 The King's Jester (1941) - Margot
 Capitan Tempesta (1942) - Haradia
 Tragic Night (1942) - Armida
 Il leone di Damasco (1942) - Haradia
 Giarabub (1942) - Dolores
 The Countess of Castiglione (1942) - Virginia Oldoini, contessa di Castiglione
 Carmela (1942) - Carmela Ferrari
 Calafuria (1943) - Marta Traversi
 Resurrection (1944) - Caterina Màslova
 Rosalba (1944)
 Nessuno torna indietro (1945) - Emanuela Andari
 Alguien se acerca (1948)
 Estrela da Manhã (1950)
 Il voto (1950) - Carmela
 Fugitive in Trieste (1951) - Lida
 I falsari (1951) - Teresa
 Repentance (1952)
 Tragic Return (1952) - Elisa
 At Sword's Edge (1952) - Columba
 The Moment of Truth (1952) - Madame Berlinga
 Papà ti ricordo (1952)
 La storia del fornaretto di Venezia (1952) - Bianca Sormani
 The Mute of Portici (1952) - Elvira d'Herrera
 Francis the Smuggler (1953) - Laila
 Flight 971 (1953) - Liliana Musso
 Il bacio dell'Aurora (1953)
 The Divine Nymph (1975) - Ferdinanda Fones

References

External links

1917 births
1995 deaths
People from Livorno
Italian film actresses
20th-century Italian actresses